Epic Fu (formerly known as JETSET) was a web series created by producers Steve Woolf and Zadi Diaz. The show premiered on June 1, 2006 with Zadi Diaz as the host and ended in 2011.

Airing weekly on the Epic Fu web site and various online distribution channels, the show draws its content from current news stories centered on art, music, technology and web culture.

Format 

Compared to Rolling Stone and MTV by Advertising Age and described as a hyperfast-paced pop culture newscast by Wired, each episode of Epic Fu runs an average of 5–10 minutes and is generally divided into four main sections: news, music, interviews, and community.

News 
Every episode of Epic Fu begins with Diaz at her desk introducing the week's top stories. The news section often includes stories highlighting how technology and the web is affecting culture in art, music, style and politics. News stories are also submitted by audience members.

Music 
The show typically includes a music video intermission called "Music Video Spotlight" also known as "Sh!t We Like," which highlights an independent or unsigned band or musician.

Interviews 
Interviews appear in the second half of the show and are generally conducted on-location. Guests include web personalities, technologists, artists, musicians, political figures, inventors, authors, television personalities, and off-beat types.

Community 
The Epic Fu community provede news links, correspondent pieces, and response videos to "Campfire" discussions. The central hub for the show's community is called MIX, currently involving over 4,000 of the show's fans, and is located on the Epic Fu website. There, fans upload photos, videos, music, submit ideas, and begin discussions on forum threads. 

EPIC FU also uses social networking sites like Twitter and Facebook to connect with fans. The show regularly initiates collaborative projects to involve its community. Some of these have been a collaborative film, flash game battles, Alternate Reality Games (ARGs), and participation in an eco-challenge called Seven Days Without Plastic. Participating members are incorporated into the show.

History 

Epic Fu first premiered as JETSET (also referred to as Jet Set Show) on June 1, 2006. Amanda Congdon and Andrew Baron were initially tied to the first few episodes of the production, but the partnership dissolved with the Rocketboom split in July 2006.

In April 2007, JETSET was the first established web show to sign with web video studio Next New Networks (NNN). NNN took the role of selling sponsorship and handling cross-promotion for the show. In its tenure with NNN, the show grew from 30,000-40,000 views per episode to 3 million views a month.

In October 2007, Smashface Productions decided to change the name of the show from JETSET to Epic Fu, citing a need to protect their intellectual property with a more original name.

After a year with NNN, Epic Fu was contemplating a move to television, but then signed with West Coast digital studio Revision3 in June 2008. A the time, EPIC FU was the highest profile web show to switch from one new media studio to another.  The partnership ended shortly after in December 2008, when Revision3 laid off nine employees, cancelled three original shows and eliminated two of its distribution deals, citing that the shows didn't fit with their long-term plans.

Currently, Epic Fu is independently run and distributed through Blip.tv.

Production 

Episodes of Epic Fu are produced by Smashface Productions and filmed in Los Angeles, California. Production is led by Diaz and Woolf.

The show has had various producers involved throughout its time on-air, including Brian Lerner and Rick Rey. Annie Tsai and Sarah Atwood have also helped in production efforts and occasionally acted as correspondents. Daniel Merlot and Mike Ambs have been credited as editors.

Segments

Below are past and present segments that have appeared on EPIC FU.

Notable interviews
A partial list of some of the people that have been interviewed on EPIC FU

 Arianna Huffington of The Huffington Post
 Chuck D of Public Enemy
 Dan Harmon & Rob Schrab, creators of Channel 101 and The Sarah Silverman Program
 Dr. Horrible writers Maurissa Tancharoen, Jed Whedon, Zack Whedon
 Elon Musk, founder of Tesla Motors and SpaceX
 Fatal1ty, pro gamer
 Felicia Day, actor and star of Dr. Horrible and The Guild
 Jonathan Coulton, singer-songwriter
 MC Frontalot, nerdcore hip-hop musician
 Patti Smith, singer-songwriter and Rock and Roll Hall of Fame musician
 Tim Heidecker & Eric Wareheim of Adult Swim's Tim and Eric Awesome Show, Great Job
 Xeni Jardin of Boing Boing

Awards

References

Further reading

 Alimurung, Gendy. LA Weekly Some UTA Online All-Stars. November 15, 2007.
 The Associated Press Websites attract striking writers with creative freedom, potential profits. November 29, 2007.
 Bell, John. Digital Influence Mapping Project Brilliant Online Show: EpicFU (sic). October 24, 2008.
 Gannes, Liz. NewTeeVee Epic Fu Creators Back at Next New Networks. March 4, 2009.
 Gannes, Liz. NewTeeVee Whither Epic Fu? Next Steps for the Seminal Web Show. September 3, 2009.
 Hart, Hugh. Wired Celebs, Nerds Win Big at Streamy Web Awards. March 30, 2009.
 Hustvedt, Marc. Tubefilter 'EPIC FU' is Back, Dazzles Web TV Meetup Crowds. January 22, 2010.
 Moran, Michael. Times Online The Web Watcher: PopJunkie TV; homemade television networks. April 24, 2008.
 McCarthy, Caroline. CNet Internet Week New York's party scene off to a testosterone-fueled start. June 5, 2008.
 Miller, Liz. NewTeeVee Epic Fu’s Return: Same Flavor, Slightly More Focus. January 22, 2010.
 Parkins, Cameron.  Creative Commons Featured Commoner: Epic Fu. August 4, 2008.
 Whitney, Daisy. TV Week Leading Digital Agents. October 26, 2008.
 Whitney, Daisy. TV Week Boxee in Deals With Blip, iPhone. March 16, 2009.

External links
 

 EPIC FU on Blip

 EPIC FU Official Myspace page
 EPIC FU Official Facebook fan page

2006 web series debuts
2011 web series endings
Creative Commons-licensed podcasts
American non-fiction web series
Internet television channels
American news websites
Video podcasts
2010s YouTube series
Streamy Award-winning channels, series or shows
2020s YouTube series